Cotton Valley is a town in central Webster Parish, Louisiana, United States. The population was 1,010 at the 2010 census.

History

Mayoral history
Cotton Valley was established in the mid-19th century, and incorporated in 1944 when J. B. Roby, a Democrat, became its first mayor. In 1946, Roby was succeeded by A. C. Borland, who served a total of 22 years. An insurance agent, Borland did not seek reelection in 1968 and was succeeded by E. M. Hollingsworth. Borland was credited with the building of the Cotton Valley city hall, recreation center and municipal park. Keith Chanler {Republican} was elected mayor in 2000 and again in 2004 and chose not to run in 2008.
Comerdis Phillips was elected mayor in 2008  Joseph Alexander became mayor in 2016.

Marlon Pope Special Learning Center
Cotton Valley was the home of the former Marlon Pope Special Learning Center, named for Chester Marlon Pope, a civic leader and Republican member of the Webster Parish School Board.

Geography

Demographics

2020 census

As of the 2020 United States census, there were 787 people, 444 households, and 289 families residing in the town.

2000 census
As of the census of 2000, there were 1,189 people, 477 households, and 313 families residing in the town. The racial makeup of the town was 56.01% White, 42.39% African American, 0.42% Native American, 0.08% from other races, and 1.09% from two or more races. Hispanic or Latino of any race were 1.43% of the population.

There were 477 households, out of which 28.1% had children under the age of 18 living with them, 41.9% were married couples living together, 19.5% had a female householder with no husband present, and 34.2% were non-families. 31.4% of all households were made up of individuals, and 15.5% had someone living alone who was 65 years of age or older. The average household size was 2.48 and the average family size was 3.10.

In the town, the population was spread out, with 26.7% under the age of 18, 11.4% from 18 to 24, 23.7% from 25 to 44, 21.8% from 45 to 64, and 16.3% who were 65 years of age or older. The median age was 38 years. For every 100 females, there were 90.2 males. For every 100 females age 18 and over, there were 86.5 males.

The median income for a household in the town was $22,000, and the median income for a family was $30,515. Males had a median income of $30,345 versus $21,635 for females. The per capita income for the town was $12,662. About 25.9% of families and 30.2% of the population were below the poverty line, including 43.4% of those under age 18 and 22.4% of those age 65 or over.

Arts and culture
A public library replaced the former facility in the old office of Dr. John Pugh, a long-time Cotton Valley physician, who began his practice in 1902.

Notable people
 Ken Beck, defensive tackle in the National Football League for two seasons for the Green Bay Packers; born in Minden, later a teacher in the Cotton Valley school system
 Roger Carr, former National Football League wide receiver who played for ten seasons with the Baltimore Colts, Seattle Seahawks and San Diego Chargers, was reared in Cotton Valley.
 The Cox Family consists of Cotton Valley natives noted for their bluegrass, Country and gospel music.  The quartet has been performing since 1976, with each child eventually joining the group. They have entertained all over the United States and in Great Britain.  They  earned two Grammy Awards and a gold record. The Coxes contributed to the soundtrack for the film O Brother, Where Art Thou?.

References

External links
Town of Cotton Valley

Towns in Louisiana
Towns in Webster Parish, Louisiana